Ebong Kiriti is a Bengali thriller drama film directed by Anirban Paria and produced by Babulal Sahoo. This film is based on a Kiriti Roy's story Ratibilaap by Bengali novelist Nihar Ranjan Gupta. It was released on 31 March 2017 in the banner of Dream Light Movie.

Plot
The plot revolves with a murder happens during a night party. Detective Kiriti Roy is present during at the party. He starts investigation in his own way. He realises that everyone is hiding some thing or not confesses properly. Finally he track down the real culprit.

Cast
 Priyanshu Chatterjee as Kiriti Roy
 Barun Chanda
 Koushik Kar as Ranjan Bose
 Saugata Bandyopadhyay as Subrata
 Moumita Gupta
 Biswajit Chakraborty
 Anirban Bhattacharya
 Ratan Kumar Panda as Reporter
 Arunava Chakraborty
 Sourav Chakraborty
 Ankitaa

References

External links
 

2017 films
Indian thriller drama films
Indian detective films
Films based on Indian novels
2017 thriller drama films
Bengali-language Indian films
2010s Bengali-language films
2017 drama films
Films based on works by Nihar Ranjan Gupta